Sothinathan s/o Sinna Goundar (born 4 April 1960) is a Malaysian Politician of Indian Tamil origin. He was also vice-president of the Malaysian Indian Congress, a component party of the Barisan Nasional ruling coalition. He was formerly the Deputy Minister of Natural Resources and Environment.

Biography 

He lost his Teluk Kemang parliamentary seat in 2008 Malaysian general elections, which saw the ruling coalition losing 82 parliamentary seats out of 222 seats to the opposition.

In 2005, Sothinathan was temporarily suspended for his criticism of the Barisan Nasional government during parliamentary debate when he got up to argue the fate of many Malaysian Indian medical students in Ukraine who were left stranded when their university was derecognized by the Government of Malaysia. His actions were criticised by many BN leaders but won much praise by Malaysian Indians, who saw him as fighting for their rights.

In 2018, Sothinathan announced his campaign for PKR President and Leader of Pakatan Harapan Anwar Ibrahim in the Port Dickson by-election.

References 

Living people
1960 births
People from Negeri Sembilan
Malaysian Hindus
Malaysian politicians of Indian descent
Malaysian politicians of Tamil descent
Malaysian Indian Congress politicians
Members of the Dewan Rakyat